Lasconotus subcostulatus is a species of cylindrical bark beetle in the family Zopheridae. It is found in North America.

References

Further reading

 
 

Zopheridae
Articles created by Qbugbot
Beetles described in 1912